Citeureup is a district  (Indonesian: Kecamatan) in the Bogor Regency, West Java, Indonesia. It is a suburb to Jakarta, and can be considered as part of its metropolitan region,  Jakarta Raya. It is also one of the districts that lies in between the city of Depok, and the city of Bogor.

References

Districts of Bogor Regency